The Central Junior League (Polish language: Centralna Liga Juniorów, CLJ) is the highest level in Polish Under-19 football. Created in mid-2013, it replaced Mloda Ekstraklasa. The winner of the CLJ advances to the UEFA Youth League.

History 
First tournament of Polish U-19 championship took place in the summer of 1936, see Football Junior Championships of Poland. The formula of the U-19 games changed several times. In some years, there was a final match, taking place before an international game featuring the national team of Poland, while on other occasions, there was a final tournament, featuring four top U-19 teams, winners of local competitions. At regional level, the championships were organized by local branches of Polish Football Association (PZPN).

In the summer of 2007, the so-called Młoda Ekstraklasa (Young Ekstraklasa) was formed. It was contested by players 21 years of age and under, also each team was allowed three players over this age limit. Despite the creation of Młoda Ekstraklasa, games of the U-19 national championships continued on regional levels: winners of local competitions played each other in the play-off series.

2012-2013 
In the summer of 2012, the Macroregional League of Older Juniors (Liga Makroregionalna Juniorów Starszych, U-19) and the Macroregional League of Younger Juniors (Liga Makroregionalna Juniorow Młodszych, U-17) were created. Both leagues had 48 teams, divided into four groups of 12 teams (each group covered four Polish provinces).

In the U-19 leagues, winners of their respective groups were the teams of Legia Warszawa, Arka Gdynia, Ruch Chorzów and Cracovia Kraków. All four played in a final tournament, which took place in mid-June 2013 in Grudziądz and Świecie. The tournament was won by Legia, which became the 2013 U-19 Champion of Poland.

In the U-17 leagues, winners of their groups were the teams of Wisła Kraków, Zawisza Bydgoszcz, Polonia Warszawa and Gwarek Zabrze. The final tournament featuring these teams took place in June 2013 in the area of Rzeszów, with Wisła Krakow becoming the 2013 U-17 Champion of Poland.

2013-2014 
In the summer of 2013, the Central Junior League was officially formed by the PZPN. It consisted of four groups (48 teams), with 12 teams in each group (every Polish province was granted three spots). The championship took place in the autumn - spring system.

Group A 
 Lodz Voivodeship: ŁKS Łódź, UKS SMS Lodz, GKS Belchatow, 
 Masovian Voivodeship: Legia Warszawa, Polonia Warszawa, Bron Radom, 
 Podlasie Voivodeship: Jagiellonia Bialystok, LKS Łomża, MOSP Bialystok, 
 Warmian-Masurian Voivodeship: Stomil Olsztyn, Sokol Ostroda, Olimpia Elblag.

This group was won by GKS Belchatow, second was Legia Warszawa. Both teams qualified to the playoffs.

Group B 
 Kuyavian-Pomeranian Voivodeship: Zawisza Bydgoszcz, Elana Torun, Lider Wloclawek, 
 Pomeranian Voivodeship: Arka Gdynia, Lechia Gdańsk, Baltyk Gdynia, 
 Greater Poland Voivodeship: Lech Poznan, Warta Poznan, Polonia Leszno, 
 West Pomeranian Voivodeship: Baltyk Koszalin, Pogon Szczecin, AP Pogon Szczecin.

This group was won by Lech Poznan, second was Pogon Szczecin. Both teams qualified to the playoffs.

Group C 
 Lower Silesian Voivodeship: Zaglebie Lubin, Slask Wroclaw, Miedz Legnica, 
 Lubusz Voivodeship: UKP Zielona Gora, Promien Zary, Polonia Slubice, 
 Opole Voivodeship: Pomologia Proszkow, MOSiR Opole, MKS Kluczbork, 
 Silesian Voivodeship: Ruch Chorzow, Gwarek Zabrze, UKS Ruch Chorzow.

This group was won by Ruch Chorzow, second was Zaglebie Lubin. Both teams qualified to the playoffs.

Group D 
 Lublin Voivodeship: Gornik Leczna, Widok Lublin, Wisla Pulawy, 
 Lesser Poland Voivodeship: Cracovia Krakow, Wisla Krakow, Sandecja Nowy Sacz, 
 Podkarpackie Voivodeship: Stal Stalowa Wola, Stal Rzeszów, Stal Mielec, 
 Swietokrzyskie Voivodeship: Korona Kielce, KSZO Ostrowiec Swietokrzyski, Juventa Starachowice.

This group was won by Wisla Krakow, second was Cracovia. Both teams qualified to the playoffs.

Play-offs 
 June 5, 2014: Zaglebie Lubin 0-2 Wisla Kraków, Cracovia 2-1 Ruch Chorzów, Legia Warszawa 2-2 Lech Poznan, Pogon Szczecin 2-1 GKS Belchatów, 
 June 8, 2014: Wisla Kraków 3-1 Zaglebie Lubin, Ruch Chorzów 0-2 Cracovia, Lech Poznan 3-0 Legia Warszawa, GKS Belchatów 2-2 Pogon Szczecin.

Semifinals 
 June 15, 2014: Wisla Kraków 5-1 Lech Poznan, Cracovia 3-5 Pogon Szczecin 
 June 19, 2014 Lech Poznan 1-1 Wisla Kraków, Pogon Szczecin 3-5 Cracovia (pen. 3-5).

Final 
 June 22, 2014: Wisla Kraków 2-1 Cracovia 
 June 25, 2014 Cracovia 0-10 Wisla Kraków.

Wisla Krakow became the 2014 U-19 Champion of Poland, and the first winner of the Central Junior League.

2014 - 2015 
In the second season of the CLJ, the league was limited to 32 teams, divided into two groups: West and East.

Group West 
Sixteen teams from eight western provinces of Poland (Lower Silesia, Lubusz, Opole, Silesia, Kuyavia-Pomerania, Pomerania, Western Pomerania, Greater Poland):

 Lech Poznan, Pogon Szczecin, Arka Gdynia, Lechia Gdańsk, Baltyk Koszalin, Warta Poznan, Zawisza Bydgoszcz, Ruch Chorzow, Zaglebie Lubin, Slask Wroclaw, MOSiR Odra Opole, UKP Zielona Gora, MKS Kluczbork, KS Stilon Gorzow Wielkopolski, Gornik Zabrze, Olimpia Grudziadz.

This group was won by Lech Poznan (70 points), second was Gornik Zabrze (63 points), third Lechia Gdańsk (61 points), and fourth Pogon Szczecin (55 points). First two teams qualified to the playoffs. Relegated were the last four teams: Odra Opole (39 points), Olimpia Grudziadz (14 points), KKS Kluczbork (14 points), and Stilon Gorzow Wielkopolski (8 points).

Group East 
Sixteen teams from eight eastern provinces of Poland (Lodz, Mazovia, Podlasie, Warmia-Mazury, Lublin, Podkarpacie, Lesser Poland, Swietokrzyskie):

 GKS Belchatow, Legia Warszawa, MKS Polonia Warszawa, Stomil Olsztyn, Jagiellonia Bialystok, Olimpia Elblag, LKS 1926 Łomża, ŁKS Łódź, Wisla Krakow, Cracovia, Korona Kielce, Stal Mielec, Wisla Pulawy, Stal Rzeszów, KSZO Ostrowiec Swietokrzyski, Motor Lublin.

This group was won by Legia Warszawa (79 points), second was Polonia Warszawa (60 points), third Cracovia (53 points), and fourth Jagiellonia Bialystok (52 points). First two teams qualified to the playoffs. Relegated were the last four teams: Olimpia Elblag (27 points), Stomil Olsztyn (25 points), LKS Łomża (24 points), and Wisla Pulawy (23 points).

Semifinals 
 June 6, 2015
Gornik Zabrze 1-1 Legia Warszawa, Polonia Warszawa 1-0 Lech Poznan,
 June 10, 2015
Legia Warszawa 2-0 Gornik Zabrze, Lech Poznan 1-0 Polonia Warszawa (pen. 4-2)

Final 
 June 17, 2015
Legia Warszawa 3-0 Lech Poznan
 June 20, 2015
Lech Poznan 2-3 Legia Warszawa

Legia Warszawa became the 2015 U-19 Champion of Poland.

2015 - 2016 
In the third season of the CLJ, the league had 32 teams, divided into two groups: West and East.

In Group West the teams that were relegated after the previous season (Odra Opole, Olimpia Grudziadz, KKS Kluczbork, Stilon Gorzow) were replaced by the four teams which won the playoffs: 
 Gwarek Zabrze, which beat Gwardia Koszalin 7-1 and 13–0,
 FC Wrocław Academy, which beat Chemik Bydgoszcz 2-0 and 2-2,
 Pomologia Prószków, which beat Jarota Jarocin 5-0 and 3–2,
 Arka Nowa Sól, which beat Gryf Słupsk 4-3 and 5–1,

In Group East the teams that were relegated after the previous season (Olimpia Elbląg, Stomil Olsztyn, ŁKS Łomża and Wisła Puławy) were replaced by the four teams which won the playoffs:
 Hutnik Kraków, which beat Resovia Rzeszów 2-0 and 1-1,
 Płomień Ełk, which beat Granat Skarżysko-Kamienna 8-0 and 4–1,
 UKS SMS Łódź, which beat Orzeł Siemiatycze 4-0 and 4–0,
 TOP 54 Biała Podlaska, which beat Unia Warszawa 2-1 and 2–1.

Sources 
 Central Junior League at PZPN's official page

See also 
 Ekstraklasa
 Football in Poland
 Polish Championship in Football

Football leagues in Poland
Youth association football in Poland
Poland